The Indian Himalayan Region (abbreviated to IHR) is the section of the Himalayas within the Republic of India, spanning seven Indian states and union territories, namely Ladakh, Jammu and Kashmir, Himachal Pradesh, Uttarakhand, Sikkim, West Bengal and Arunachal Pradesh. The region is responsible for providing water to a large part of the Indian subcontinent and contains various flora and fauna.

Physiographically, the Himalayas start from the foothills of south (Sivaliks) and extend up to the Tibetan plateau on the north (Trans-Himalaya). Three major geographical entities, the Himadri (greater Himalaya), Himachal (lesser Himalaya) and the Sivaliks (outer Himalaya), extend almost uninterrupted throughout its length and are separated by major geological fault lines. Mighty but older waterways like the Indus, Sutlej, Kali, Kosi and Brahmaputra cut steep gorges through the main Himalayan range to escape into the Great Plains, establishing their antecedence.

The northernmost range of mountains are the trans-Himalayan Karakoram Mountains that continue from India into Pakistan and China. To the south of the Karakoram Range lie the Zanskar and Ladakh ranges.

Some of the highest mountains on earth are found in the region. Many perennial, glacier-fed rivers flow from the Himalayas.

Trans-Himalaya
Trans-Himalaya ranges in India include the Karakoram, Zanskar and Ladakh ranges that run through Ladakh and Himachal Pradesh. At the eastern end, some portion of the Kangri Karpo (a trans-Himalayan range) forms part of the northern boundary of Arunachal Pradesh with Tibet.

Karakoram Range
The Karakoram is a giant range, which geographically divides India and Central Asia. The range consists of high mountain peaks like K2, Rimo and Teram Kargri. The Korakoram Pass acts as the main connector between the markets of Yarkand, Leh and Kashgar.

Ladakh Range
To the north of the Leh lies the Ladakh Range and it is an important part of the Trans-Himalayan range that merges with the Kailash Range in Tibet. Here the important passes are the famous Khardung La, and Digar La, which lie to the northeast of Leh.

Zanskar Range
The Zanskar Range lies to the north of the main Himalaya. It acts as a backbone of Ladakh south of the Indus River, extending from the ridges beyond Lamayuru in the west across the Zanskar region; there it is divided from the main Himalaya by the Stod, Tsarap and Zanskar valleys. On the east of the Zanskar region the range continues through the Lahaul and Spiti district of Himachal Pradesh. Some of the main passes are the Fatu La, on the Leh-Srinagar road, while the main trekking passes into the Zanskar valley are Singge La, the Cha Cha La and the Rubrang La.

Middle Himalaya

Pir Panjal Range
The Kashmir valley is bounded by this range to its west and south. The resort town of Gulmarg is located on the northern slope of the range. Important passes include the Banihal pass, the Pir Panjal pass, the Sinthan pass and the Rohtang pass.

Dhauladhar Range
To the south of the Pir Panjal lies the Dhauladhar range. It lies to the north of the Kangra valley, from where it appears to rise almost vertical. It forms the water divide between the Ravi and Beas rivers. In the west it divides the Chenab valley and the Tawi Valley. It is located mostly in Himachal Pradesh.

Sivalik Hills
The southern most range of the Himalayas are the Sivaliks. Sivaliks extend over a width of 10–50 km, and have an altitude varying between 900 m and 1100 m.

These ranges are called by different names in different regions:
Jammu Hills in Jammu region
Mishmi Hills in Arunachal Pradesh

These parts consist of thick gravel and alluvium.

The valley lying between the Lesser Himalayas and Shivalik ranges are called as Duns. Dehradun, Kalka Dun and Jammu Dun are some of the prominent Duns. It is the southern most region of the Himalayas.

References

External links
 
  Resource Information Database of Indian Himalaya

Regions of India